The Americas Zone was one of the three regional zones of the 1985 Davis Cup.

8 teams entered the Americas Zone in total, with the winner promoted to the following year's World Group. Mexico defeated Brazil in the final and qualified for the 1986 World Group.

Participating nations

Draw

Quarterfinals

Venezuela vs. Brazil

Uruguay vs. Colombia

Canada vs. Caribbean/West Indies

Mexico vs. Peru

Semifinals

Brazil vs. Colombia

Canada vs. Mexico

Final

Brazil vs. Mexico

References

External links
Davis Cup official website

Davis Cup Americas Zone
Americas